Michael Winter may refer to:

Michael Winter (professor) (born 1955), director of the Centre for Rural Policy Research at the University of Exeter
Michael Winter (writer) (born 1965), Canadian writer
Mike Winter (equestrian) (born 1974), Canadian equestrian
Mike Winter (born 1952), Austrian-American soccer goalkeeper
Michael Winter (sport shooter) (born 1976), German Olympic sport shooter

See also
Michael Winters (disambiguation)